Lake Metroparks Farmpark is a working farm located in Kirtland, Ohio.

The park hopes to help people understand how farm life has developed over time, and reinforces that farming is a current and viable lifestyle. Lake Farmpark strives not only to help people understand the past of agriculture but also to draw attention to the present situation of the industry while envisioning future applications. 

The farm features dairy cows and daily milking sessions, wagon rides, a plant science center and a building with historic and modern tractors and farm equipment.  The barnyard animals include pigs, sheep, chickens, rabbits, horses,  llamas, alpacas and goats. Seasonal and weekend activities include cheese making, sheep-shearing, maple sugaring and harvesting.
 
It was named one of the top 10 educational sites to learn about farming by USA Today.

References
Lake Farmpark Sandy Mitchell, Your Guide to Cleveland, About.com
10 great places to dig up old dirt on farming Kathy Baruffi, USA Today, 2007-03-22 
"Back to the Land", Susie Taylor, Our Ohio

External links
Lake Farmpark - official site at Lake Metroparks

Protected areas of Lake County, Ohio
Parks in Ohio
Museums in Lake County, Ohio
Farm museums in Ohio
1990 establishments in Ohio